The 0-10,000 Fast Pairs or 10K Fast Pairs is held at the Fall American Contract Bridge League (ACBL) North American Bridge Championship (NABC).

The 10K Fast Pairs is a four-session matchpoint pairs event with two qualifying sessions and two final sessions; tables are permitted 11 minutes to finish their two-board rounds, rather than the standard 15 minutes. The event is restricted to players with fewer than 10,000 masterpoints.

History
The inaugural 10K Fast Pairs was held in 2015 at the Fall NABC in Denver, Colorado.

Winners

Sources

"ACBL Live" acbl.org. ACBL. Retrieved 1 August 2019.
"NABC Winners"  acbl.org. ACBL. Retrieved 13 November 2020

References

External links
ACBL official website

North American Bridge Championships